Dunnae station, is a railway station in Dunnae-myeon, Hoengseong, South Korea. It is served by the Gangneung Line. The station opened on 22 December 2017, ahead of the 2018 Winter Olympics.

References

Railway stations in Gangwon Province, South Korea
Railway stations opened in 2017